The 1989 Kent State Golden Flashes football team was an American football team that represented Kent State University in the Mid-American Conference (MAC) during the 1989 NCAA Division I-A football season. In their second season under head coach Dick Crum, the Golden Flashes compiled a 0–11 record (0–8 against MAC opponents), finished in ninth place in the MAC, and were outscored by all opponents by a combined total of 377 to 179.

The team's statistical leaders included Terry Daniels with 304 rushing yards, Joe Dalpra with 1,089 passing yards, and Andre Palmer with 417 receiving yards.

Schedule

References

Kent State
Kent State Golden Flashes football seasons
College football winless seasons
Kent State Golden Flashes football